In Greek mythology, the Ourea (plural of ) were the parthenogenetic offspring of Gaia (Earth), produced alongside Uranus (Sky), and Pontus (Sea). According to Hesiod:

Notes

References
Apollonius Rhodius, Argonautica translated by Robert Cooper Seaton (1853-1915), R. C. Loeb Classical Library Volume 001. London, William Heinemann Ltd, 1912. Online version at the Topos Text Project.
 Caldwell, Richard, Hesiod's Theogony, Focus Publishing/R. Pullins Company (June 1, 1987). . Internet Archive.
Fitz Simon, James A., Vincent Alphonso Fitz Simon, The Gods of Old: and The Story That They Tell, T. Fisher Unwin, 1899. p. 27
Gantz, Timothy, Early Greek Myth: A Guide to Literary and Artistic Sources, Johns Hopkins University Press, 1996, Two volumes:  (Vol. 1),  (Vol. 2).
Hard, Robin, Herbert Jennings Rose, The Routledge Handbook of Greek Mythology: Based on H.J. Rose's "Handbook of Greek mythology", Routledge, 2004. . p. 24
Hesiod, Theogony from The Homeric Hymns and Homerica with an English Translation by Hugh G. Evelyn-White, Cambridge, MA., Harvard University Press; London, William Heinemann Ltd. 1914. Online version at the Perseus Digital Library. Greek text available from the same website.
Littleton, Scott and the Marshall Cavendish Corporation Gods, Goddesses, and Mythology, Volume 1. Marshall Cavendish, 2005. . pp. 1020, 1134

Greek gods
Children of Gaia
Mountain gods
Greek primordial deities